Catherine Wagner may refer to:
 Catherine Wagner (poet)
 Catherine Wagner (artist)